Meet Dr. Christian is a 1939 American film directed by Bernard Vorhaus, the first of six films in the Dr. Christian series.

Cast 
Jean Hersholt as Dr. Paul Christian
Dorothy Lovett as Nurse Judy Price
Robert Baldwin as Roy Davis
Enid Bennett as Anne Hewitt
Paul Harvey as Mayor John Hewitt
Marcia Mae Jones as Marilee
Jackie Moran as Don Hewitt
Maude Eburne as Mrs. Hastings
Frank Coghlan Jr. as Bud
Patsy Parsons as Patsy Hewitt
Sarah Edwards as Mrs. Minnows
 John Kelly as Jim Cass
Eddie Acuff as Joe Benson

References

External links 

1939 films
1939 drama films
American black-and-white films
American drama films
Films with screenplays by Ring Lardner Jr.
1930s English-language films
Films directed by Bernard Vorhaus
1930s American films
Dr. Christian films